Petar Georgiev may refer to:

 Petar Georgiev-Kalica (born 1951), Macedonian composer and songwriter
 Petar Georgiev (cyclist) (born 1929), Bulgarian cyclist
 Petar Georgiev (diver) (born 1961), Bulgarian diver
 Petar Georgiev (gymnast) (1965–2013), Bulgarian gymnast
 Petar Georgiev (swimmer) (born 1959), Bulgarian swimmer
 Petar Georgiev (footballer) (born 2002), Bulgarian footballer